Noël is the sixth studio and first Christmas album by Joan Baez, released in November 1966.

Working with arranger-conductor Peter Schickele (PDQ Bach), Baez, for the first time, recorded an album outside the standard guitar-based folk format. She worked with Schickele on her next two albums, both of which also featured classical orchestration.

Unlike holiday albums by many other popular artists, Baez included mostly traditional material, avoiding more lighthearted or commercial fare in favor of a somber, understated tone. She included both familiar ("The Little Drummer Boy") and more obscure ("Down in Yon Forest") material. The album also contains several brief instrumental selections arranged by Schickele.

Track listing

Original LP

Side 1
"O Come, O Come, Emmanuel" (Traditional) - 2:58
"Coventry Carol" (Traditional) - 1:58
"Good King Wenceslas" (Traditional) - instrumental - 0:27
"The Little Drummer Boy" (Katherine Kennicott Davis, Henry Onorati, Harry Simeone) - 3:03
"I Wonder as I Wander" (John Jacob Niles) - 3:57
"Bring a Torch, Jeanette, Isabella" - instrumental - 0:38
"Down in Yon Forest" (Traditional) - 1:40
"The Carol of the Birds" (Traditional) - 3:33
"Angels We Have Heard On High" (Traditional) - instrumental - 1:22

Side 2
"Ave Maria" (Franz Schubert) (sung in German) - 4:08
"Mary's Wandering" (Traditional) - 3:18
"Deck the Halls" (Traditional) - instrumental - 0:19
"Away in a Manger" (James Ramsey Murray) - 1:56
"Adeste Fideles (O Come, all ye Faithful)" (Traditional) - instrumental - 0:47
"Cantique de Noël (O Holy Night)" (Adolphe Adam) - 3:49
"What Child Is This" (Traditional) - 3:01
"Silent Night" (Franz Xaver Gruber) - 2:25

 Baez dedicated "The Carol of the Birds" to Pablo Casals.

CD bonus tracks
18. "The First Noel" (Traditional) - 2:29
19. "We Three Kings" (Traditional) - instrumental - 1:47
20. "Virgin Mary" (Traditional) - 2:59
21. "Good Christian Kings" (Traditional) - instrumental - 0:55
22. "Burgundian Carol" (Traditional) - 4:35
23. "Away in a Manger" (James Ramsey Murray) - alternate version sung in French - 1:57

Personnel
Joan Baez – vocals, guitar
Peter Schickele – arranger, conductor

1966 Christmas albums
Albums produced by Maynard Solomon
Christmas albums by American artists
Folk Christmas albums
German-language albums
Joan Baez albums
Vanguard Records albums